Lizzie Scott (born 9 January 2004) is an English cricketer who currently plays for North East Warriors and Northern Diamonds. She plays as a right-arm medium bowler. She has previously played for Northumberland.

Early life
Scott was born on 9 January 2004 in Hexham, Northumberland.

Domestic career
Scott made her county debut in 2016, for Northumberland against Lincolnshire. She scored her maiden half-century in 2017, scoring 58 in a County Championship match against Durham. She was her side's leading run-scorer in the 2018 Women's Twenty20 Cup, with 190 runs in 8 matches. She was Northumberland's leading wicket-taker in the 2019 Women's County Championship, with 12 wickets including her maiden five-wicket haul, 5/24 against Scotland.

In 2020, Northumberland combined with Durham to form North East Warriors. She took five wickets for the side at an average of 18.20 in the 2021 Women's Twenty20 Cup, and three wickets at an average of 28.00 in the 2022 Women's Twenty20 Cup.

Scott was included in the Northern Diamonds Academy squad in 2021 and 2022. She was promoted to the full squad in September 2022, making her debut against Western Storm on 11 September in the Rachael Heyhoe Flint Trophy, taking 1/53. She went on to play two more matches for Diamonds that season, taking two more wickets as her side won the Rachael Heyhoe Flint Trophy.

International career
In October 2022, Scott was selected in the England Under-19 squad for the 2023 ICC Under-19 Women's T20 World Cup. She went on to play three matches in the tournament.

References

External links

2004 births
Living people
Sportspeople from Hexham
Cricketers from Northumberland
Northumberland women cricketers
North East Warriors cricketers
Northern Diamonds cricketers